Michael Duffy (1848 or 1849 - 4 February 1926) was a member of the Queensland Legislative Assembly.

Biography
Duffy was born in Westmeath, Ireland, the son of John Duffy and arrived in Queensland in 1865. He was a general bushworker in western Queensland before settling in Bundaberg in 1873 where he first worked as a storekeeper. He leased a wharf in 1878 and from 1880-1888 was an Australia Steam navigation agent and later on was a partner in a sugar company. He retired to Sydney in 1908.

On 28 August 1876 Duffy married Bertha Grossman (died 1929) and together had three sons and six daughters. He died in Mosman, Sydney  in February 1926 and his funeral proceeded from his Mosman residence to the Church of England Cemetery, Northern Suburbs.

Public career
Duffy was a member of the Bundaberg Divisional Board, later the Municipality of Bundaberg and was Mayor of Bundaberg in 1886, 1888, and 1906. He was also a member of the Bundaberg Chamber of Commerce, the Bundaberg Hospital Board, and the Bundaberg Fire Brigade.

At the 1893 Queensland election, representing the Ministerialists, Duffy won the seat of Bundaberg in the Queensland Legislative Assembly. He held it for one term, losing to Labour's Thomas Glassey in 1896.

References

Members of the Queensland Legislative Assembly
1840s births
1926 deaths